Ukraine (sports society) is a physical culture and sports association of Ukraine.

History
At the end of the eighties (1987) the former sports associations of trade unions "Avanhard", "Burevestnik", "Vodnik", "Zenit", "Kolos", "Lokomotiv", and "Spartak" were united into the All-Union volunteer physical culture and sports association of trade unions (VDFSTP). After several years "Kolos" has separated from it and in 1991 VDFSTP was reorganized into the sports association of trade unions "Ukraine".

Sports clubs
 SC Zirka 2002

Olympic centers

Ukraine sports society

Trade Union Federation of Ukraine
 Olympic sports training center "Spartak", Alushta
 Olympic sports training base "Avanhard", Yalta
 Sports training base of Olympic preparation "Sviatoshyn", Kyiv
 Rowing youth sports school "Slavutych", Kyiv
 Sports training base "Avanhard", Vorokhta

See also
 Ukraina Lwów

External links
 Lisnychenko, Yu. Sports association "Ukraine". "Vechirnia Hazeta". April 6, 2006.
 List of Olympic centers

1991 establishments in Ukraine
Sport societies in Ukraine
Sports clubs established in 1991
Federation of Trade Unions of Ukraine